"Say It Isn't So" is a song performed by American duo Daryl Hall & John Oates, and written by Daryl Hall. It was released by RCA Records in October 1983 as the first of two new singles from their compilation album Rock 'n Soul Part 1, released that same year (see 1983 in music). The song was remixed as a "special extended dance mix" by John "Jellybean" Benitez, which topped Billboard magazine's Hot Dance Club Play chart. The song peaked at number two on the Billboard Hot 100 for four weeks, behind coincidentally "Say Say Say" by Paul McCartney and Michael Jackson.

Composition and recording 
"Say It Isn't So" was written by Daryl Hall during the duo's supporting tour for H2O. It was the first of two new songs recorded during the sessions for Rock 'n Soul Part 1. The sessions took place in September 1983 at Electric Lady Studio A in New York City. The song was produced by Daryl Hall and John Oates, with recording by Bob Clearmountain, who co-produced the recordings. The backing musicians on the song were bassist Tom "T-Bone" Wolk, saxophonist Charles DeChant, guitarist G. E. Smith, drummer Mickey Curry, and percussionist Jimmy Bralower. The song's arrangement was developed in the studio with backing vocals inspired by the Flamingos' version of "I Only Have Eyes for You" and a problem with a break in the song solved by Jimmy Bralower.

Reception
Cash Box called it "a derivative and decidedly Motown-inflected outing" that is "more vital than nostalgic."

Music videos 
There were two versions of the video. The first version was once aired on MTV as part of the duo's special titled The Greatest & The Latest. The second version, which was on heavy rotation during the channel's heyday, was filmed on location in New York City.

Chart performance

Weekly charts

Year-end charts

Track listings

7" 45 RPM

12" 33⅓ RPM

See also 
List of number-one dance hits (United States)

References 

1983 singles
1983 songs
Hall & Oates songs
Songs written by Daryl Hall
Dance-pop songs
RCA Records singles
Song recordings produced by Bob Clearmountain